The 1956–57 season was the 84th season of competitive football in Scotland and the 60th season of the Scottish Football League.

Scottish League Division One

Champions: Rangers
Relegated: Dunfermline Athletic, Ayr United

Scottish League Division Two

Promoted: Clyde, Third Lanark

Cup honours

Other Honours

National

County

 - aggregate over two legs

Highland League

Scotland national team

Key:
 (H) = Home match
 (A) = Away match
 WCQG9 = World Cup qualifying - Group 9
 BHC = British Home Championship

Notes and references

External links
Scottish Football Historical Archive